Zen is a Hong Kong rock music band that was signed by Warner Bros. Records and had its debut album in 1995. They disbanded in 2000 and re-formed in 2005.

Band members 

Vocal: 黃和興 (Addison)
Bass Guitar: 鄭偉鴻 (Martin)
Guitar: 鄧明輝 (James)
Drums: 關禮琛（Pesky）

Discography 
1994: I Remember You（EP）　
1995: 交織怒火 Warner Bros. Records
1995: 晴天
2000: Kawan

Awards 
Commercial Radio Hong Kong best song
Metro Broadcast Corporation）best new group
Radio Television Hong Kong best new group

References

Chinese rock music groups
Hong Kong musical groups
Musical groups established in 1994
Warner Records artists
Musical groups disestablished in 2000
Musical groups reestablished in 2005
1994 establishments in Hong Kong